Benucci is a surname. Notable people with the surname include:

 Francesco Benucci ( 1745–5 April 1824), Italian bass/baritone singer
 Massimiliano Benucci (born 1998), Italian footballer
 Henriette Benucci (1858–1943), wife of French statesman Raymond Poincaré

See also
 Bonucci